The Estonian National Independence Party, or ENIP, (ERSP), founded on 20 August 1988 in Estonian SSR, was the first non-communist political party established in the former USSR. Founders of the party were nationalist and anti-communist dissidents.

The initiative to establish the Estonian independentist party came from Vello Väärtnõu, the leader of a local Buddhist group. On 30 January 1988 he organized a press conference in Moscow for Western media where he announced plans for the formation of the party, with the aim to restore the fully independent Republic of Estonia as a nation state on the restitution principle. This made the ENIP the most radical or political movement of its day. Väärtnõu and several fellow Buddhists were expelled from the Soviet Union shortly after the press conference. ENIP was officially founded in August 1988 in the village of Pilistvere in central Estonia.

ENIP represented the radical wing of the Estonian independence movement and used "hardline" anti-communist rhetoric, in contrast with the Popular Front that cooperated with pro-reform communists. The party gained a majority during the February 1990 elections of the Congress of Estonia. After Estonia regained independence in 1991, ENIP was part of the centre-right government from 1992–1995, and later merged with Pro Patria to form the Pro Patria Union, a national-conservative party.

See also
Rahvarinne, another major political movement of the era
Latvian National Independence Movement, a similar organization in Latvia

References

External links
Buddhist Against Empire

Defunct political parties in Estonia
1988 establishments in Estonia
1995 disestablishments in Estonia
Political parties established in 1988
Singing Revolution
Pro-independence parties in the Soviet Union
Nationalist parties in Estonia
Political parties disestablished in 1995

de:Rahvarinne#Erste Dissidentenbewegungen